Aske is a civil parish in the Richmondshire district of North Yorkshire, England, about two miles north of Richmond.

According to the 2001 census it had a population of 122, falling to less than 100 at the 2011 Census. From this date population information is included in the parish of Whashton.

In the early 1870s Aske was described as:

ASKE, a township in Easby parish, N. R. Yorkshire; 2½ miles N of Richmond. Acres, 1,670. Real property, £1,537. Pop., 140. Houses, 20. Aske Hall is the seat of the Earl of Zetland; belonged formerly to the Darcys; and commands a fine prospect up and down the Swale.

References

Civil parishes in North Yorkshire